The 2015–16 Sheffield Shield season was the 114th season of the Sheffield Shield, the domestic first-class cricket competition in Australia. The season began after the conclusion of the Matador BBQs One-Day Cup, and included a break halfway through to allow for the Big Bash League. Trials for day/night Tests with a pink ball continued, having been introduced during the previous season. All of the matches for rounds one and seven of the tournament were played as day/night games. Victoria won their second consecutive title, defeating South Australia by 7 wickets in the final at Gliderol Stadium. Travis Head was named player of the series for his 721 runs and 9 wickets during the season. Ben Dunk of Tasmania was the leading run-scorer, while Joe Mennie from South Australia took the most wickets.

Points table

Round-Robin stage

Round 1

Round 2

Round 3

Round 4

Round 5

Round 6

Round 7

Round 8

Round 9

Round 10

Final

Statistics

Most runs

Most wickets

References

External links
 2015-16 Sheffield Shield on ESPN Cricinfo
 2015-16Sheffield Shield on Cricket Australia

Sheffield Shield
Sheffield Shield
Sheffield Shield seasons